Damir Mišković (born 20 March 1965) is a Croatian businessman and entrepreneur who is the chairman and owner of Croatian football club HNK Rijeka, a position he has held since 2012.

Early and personal life
Mišković was born in 1965 in Rijeka. His family is originally from the village of Miškovići on the island of Pag which his grandfather had left after the Second World War for Rijeka, where he was employed in the port. Damir's father Šime grew up in old part of Rijeka where he met his mother who worked in a footwear store Beograd (Serbian capital city).

His whole family is personally very attached to development and successes of the club. Due to his work obligations Mišković spends his time in Dubai, London, Africa and occasionally Rijeka.

Mišković also used to be a football goalkeeper, playing for many local clubs such as Krasica, Orijent 1919, Pomorac 1921 and Grobničan.

Business career
After completing the maritime school, Mišković went to work in Norway where he worked in the port, responsible for controlling the loading and unloading of goods. He continued his fast growing career in West Africa, where he initially worked in the port town of Warri for leading logistics corporation dedicated to oil and gas industry Orlean Invest Holding. Although the working conditions were very difficult he soon became the youngest general manager and through years became executive director of the same company. The aforementioned company has concessions for four ports in which all the necessary logistics are available for oil and gas companies that deal with onshore and offshore drilling.

On 20 March 2012 Mišković rescued Croatian football club HNK Rijeka from debt and threatening collapse, becoming the club's owner and chairman. HNK Rijeka is his hometown club which he was a big fan of from his youngest age. Over the next several years he created the powerful football club with excellent results recorded domestically and in Europe. Over the years Mišković invested approximately 50 million euros into the club and associated infrastructure, including the construction of new training camp and stadium called Rujevica. Very soon after taking ownership and establishing management that today leads the club HNK Rijeka won several historical trophies and the most important one is first-ever league title in 2017, ending Dinamo Zagreb's run of eleven successive titles. Rijeka has also won five Croatian Cups, including back-to-back titles in 2005, 2006, 2014 and in 2017 which helped them secure the historic Double, and most recently in 2019.

References

Living people
1965 births
Businesspeople from Rijeka
HNK Rijeka chairmen and investors
University of Rijeka alumni
HNK Orijent players
NK Grobničan players
NK Pomorac 1921 players
Yugoslav footballers
Association footballers not categorized by position